Edward Edmondson Jr. (1830–1883) was an American artist, active for most of his career in Dayton, Ohio.

Selected works

References

1830 births
1883 deaths
19th-century American painters
American male painters
19th-century American male artists